Subbiano is a small town and comune (municipality) in the province of Arezzo, Tuscany, central Italy, on the left bank of the River Arno.
 
It is adjacent to the north of Arezzo, and south of Bibbiena. Other neighbouring municipalities include Anghiari (east) and Capolona (west) and Sansepolcro (also east).

References

Cities and towns in Tuscany